Alejandro Sánchez Alvarado is a molecular biologist, an investigator of the Howard Hughes Medical Institute, and executive director and Chief Scientific Officer of the Stowers Institute for Medical Research. The Sánchez Alvarado Laboratory focuses on understanding the regenerative capabilities of the planarian flatworm Schmidtea mediterranea.  In 2015, Sánchez Alvarado was elected a fellow of the American Academy of Arts and Sciences, and to the National Academy of Sciences in 2018 for his distinguished and continuing achievements in original scientific research.

Life 
Born in Venezuela, Sánchez Alvarado attended the Colegio Emil Friedman for elementary and high school education, where he first cultivated his interest in biology. After receiving a BS in molecular biology and chemistry from Vanderbilt University in 1986, he attended the University of Cincinnati College of Medicine for his PhD in pharmacology and cell biophysics in the laboratory of Dr. Jeffrey Robbins. After receiving his Ph.D. in 1992, he carried out postdoctoral studies from 1994 to 1995 in Baltimore, Maryland at the Carnegie Institution of Washington, Department of Embryology under the mentorship of Dr. Donald D. Brown. He was then appointed Staff Associate at the Department of Embryology to run his own independent research group and during which he started to develop the planarian S. mediterranea as a research organism to study animal regeneration

References

Living people
Venezuelan biologists
Vanderbilt University alumni
University of Cincinnati College of Medicine alumni
1964 births
Stowers Institute for Medical Research people